Kiss Toledo Goodbye is a 1999 independent comedy/thriller film directed by Lyndon Chubbuck. Film stars Michael Rapaport, Christopher Walken, Robert Forster, Nancy Allen and Christine Taylor. Rapaport plays a young man who suddenly learns that the biological father he knew nothing about is a crime lord. Upon witnessing his father's death, he is expected to join forces with his new "family" and is challenged to prove himself.

Plot 
Following the assassination of his crime-boss biological father (Robert Forster), whom he had not even known existed, a young Ohio investment advisor (Michael Rapaport) must impersonate a Mafia Godfather for a few weeks to prevent a gang war.

He tries to keep this new life secret from his real family, especially his very jealous fiancée (Christine Taylor), with the help of his new "family" and his father's chief lieutenant (Christopher Walken). At the same time he is being pressured by his boss at work to sign-off on a due diligence report for a questionable investment, trying to keep his family safe, dodging assassination attempts, and trying to uncover who killed his father.

Cast
 Michael Rapaport as Kevin Gower
 Christopher Walken as Max
 Robert Forster as Sal Fortuna
 Christine Taylor as Deeann Emory
 Jamie Anderson as Wendy
 Nancy Allen as Madge
 Paul Schulze as Nicky
 Paul Ben-Victor as Vince
 Saul Stein as Anthony
 Robert Pine as Oz

External links

1999 films
Mafia comedy films
1990s crime comedy films
American independent films
1990s English-language films
American crime comedy films
1999 comedy films
1999 independent films
1990s American films